St. John's Methodist Church is a historic Methodist church located at Springfield Crossroads near Georgetown, Sussex County, Delaware. It was built in 1907, and is a one-story, frame church building sheathed in weatherboard in the Gothic Revival style. It sits on a raised brick foundation, has a steeply pitched gable roof, lancet windows, and features a two-story bell tower with steeple. The property also includes the church hall, which was originally constructed at the Civilian Conservation Corps Camp near Georgetown.  It was moved to the property in 1949, and subsequently renovated. Adjacent to the church is the church cemetery, with burials dating to 1853.

The site was added to the National Register of Historic Places in 1990.

References

External links

Delaware Public Archives: St. John's Methodist Church

United Methodist churches in Delaware
Churches on the National Register of Historic Places in Delaware
Carpenter Gothic church buildings in Delaware
Churches completed in 1907
20th-century Methodist church buildings in the United States
Churches in Sussex County, Delaware
Buildings and structures in Georgetown, Delaware
National Register of Historic Places in Sussex County, Delaware